Jaffna Town East Grama Niladhari Division is a Grama Niladhari Division of the Jaffna Divisional Secretariat of Jaffna District of Northern Province, Sri Lanka. It has Grama Niladhari Division Code J/74.

Holy Family Convent, Jaffna, Jaffna railway station, Roman Catholic Diocese of Jaffna, St. Mary's Cathedral, Jaffna, Jaffna, St. Patrick's College, Jaffna, Vembadi Girls High School, St. John's College, Jaffna, Subhas Hotel and Vannarpannai South East are located within, nearby or associated with Jaffna Town East.

Jaffna Town East is a surrounded by the Jaffna Town West, Chundikuli South, Gurunagar East, Attiaddy, Chundikuli North and Gurunagar West Grama Niladhari Divisions.

Demographics

Ethnicity 

The Jaffna Town East Grama Niladhari Division has a Sri Lankan Tamil majority (97.4%). In comparison, the Jaffna Divisional Secretariat (which contains the Jaffna Town East Grama Niladhari Division) has a Sri Lankan Tamil majority (95.6%)

Religion 

The Jaffna Town East Grama Niladhari Division has a Roman Catholic majority (63.9%) and a significant Hindu population (27.5%). In comparison, the Jaffna Divisional Secretariat (which contains the Jaffna Town East Grama Niladhari Division) has a Roman Catholic majority (52.9%) and a significant Hindu population (37.7%)

Gallery

References 

Grama Niladhari divisions of Sri Lanka
Jaffna District